Section 91(27) of the Constitution Act, 1867, also known as the criminal law power, grants the Parliament of Canada the authority to legislate on:

Scope of the federal power

Section 91(27) is by and large the broadest of the enumerated powers allocated to the federal government. As noted by Estey J. in Scowby v. Glendinning:

History and jurisprudence

The meaning of the phrase "criminal law" was historically a matter of debate. It was first defined by Lord Haldane of the Judicial Committee of the Privy Council, writing in the opinion for the Board of Commerce case, as that area:

In Proprietary Articles Trade Association v. Attorney General of Canada, Lord Atkin, writing for the Council, rejected this interpretation:

The modern interpretation was articulated by Rand J. in the Margarine Reference where the Court stated:

Therefore, the following must be met for a law to be criminal in nature:

The issues relating to prohibitions and penalties can be approached separately, as noted by Laskin C.J. in Attorney General of Canada v. Canadian National Transportation, Ltd.:

Nature of a public purpose

Such interests have been extended to include matters such as the environment, as noted in R. v. Hydro-Québec.

In addition, the power has been held to extend to the regulation of dangerous products, as noted in Reference re Firearms Act (control of firearms and licensing of owners) and RJR-MacDonald Inc. v. Canada (Attorney General) (control of tobacco products).

Limitations

The criminal law power is not unlimited in scope, as noted recently in the Reference re Assisted Human Reproduction Act, where the majority held that it is not enough to identify a public purpose that would have justified Parliament’s action  it must also involve suppressing an evil or safeguarding a threatened interest.  The evil must be real and the apprehension of harm must be reasonable. Recourse to the criminal law power cannot be based solely on concerns for efficiency or consistency, as such concerns, viewed in isolation, do not fall under the criminal law.

There are limits to the power's extent under the Canadian Charter of Rights and Freedoms, most notably on the question of proportionality. In R. v. Big M Drug Mart Ltd., Dickson J. asserted that limitations on rights must be motivated by an objective of sufficient importance.  Moreover, the limit must be as small as possible.  In R. v. Oakes, he elaborated on the standard when one David Oakes was accused of selling narcotics.  Dickson for a unanimous Court found that Oakes' rights had been violated because he had been presumed guilty.  This violation was not justified under the second step of the following two-step process:

 There must be a pressing and substantial objective
 The means must be proportional
 it must be rationally connected to the objective
 there must be minimal impairment of rights
 there must be proportionality between the infringement and objective

The test is heavily founded in factual analysis so strict adherence is not always practiced. A degree of overlap is to be expected as there are some factors, such as vagueness, which are to be considered in multiple sections. If the legislation fails any of the above branches, it is unconstitutional. Otherwise the impugned law passes the Oakes test and remains valid.

Types of offences in Canadian law

There are a variety of offences that can be prosecuted in Canadian courts, but not all of them can be considered as criminal in nature. In R. v. City of Sault Ste-Marie, they were classified into the following categories, of which only the first qualifies as criminal (and therefore under federal jurisdiction):

Regulatory offences are subject to the Canadian Charter of Rights and Freedoms. In that regard, The Supreme Court of Canada has ruled:

 in R. v. Wholesale Travel Group Inc., where they possess a mens rea component of negligence, coupled with a defence of due diligence, they will not violate section 7 of the Charter; and
 in Re B.C. Motor Vehicle Act, the combination of absolute liability and possible imprisonment violates section 7 and will rarely be upheld under section 1.

Provincial jurisdiction

Related powers are available to the provincial legislatures under the following headings of section 92:

Administration of justice

This power entitles the provinces to establish police forces, prosecution services, penitentiaries, parole services, and ancillary agencies associated with the administration of criminal justice in the province. By its nature, its operation is interconnected with the criminal law power.

As held in Attorney General of Canada v. Canadian National Transportation, Ltd., the administration of justice does not embrace prosecutorial authority respecting the federal criminal law. This can be exercised by either level of government under terms prescribed by federal law.

Fines and penalties

A province can attach criminal penalties to valid provincial laws. Consequently, there is frequent debate over whether a provincial law is intruding upon the federal criminal law power.

Where the province enacts a regulatory scheme that contains penalties, and that concerns matters normally within its jurisdiction, the law is typically upheld.

 In Bedard v. Dawson, a provincial law that shut down "disorderly houses" within the meaning of the Criminal Code was held to be in relation to property and civil rights.
 In Provincial Secretary of Prince Edward Island v. Egan and O'Grady v. Sparling, provincial driving offences that overlapped with federal driving offences were upheld as concerning the regulation of highway traffic.

Matters of a local or private nature

Penal laws regulating matters of a local nature have been upheld, as in:

 Dupond v. Montreal (parades in the streets), and 
 Nova Scotia Board of Censors v. McNeil (film censorship).

However, regulation of activities in the street have not always been upheld. In Westendorp v. The Queen, the Court struck down a provincial law (authorizing municipalities to pass bylaws for prohibiting persons remaining in the street for the purposes of prostitution) as it was attempting to "control or punish prostitution".

Licensing

Licensing schemes have been frequently challenged as encroaching on the federal power. In Rio Hotel Ltd. v. New Brunswick (Liquor Licensing Board), a provincial licensing scheme required a liquor license to be accompanied by an entertainment licence to which conditions could be attached with respect to live entertainment and contests held on the licensed premises. The conditions attaching the entertainment licence in question specified the degree of nudity acceptable and rules for staging events presupposing the removal of clothing. The Court held it to be regulating entertainment as a means to boost alcohol sales. Though there are provisions within the Criminal Code dealing with nudity, they did not conflict with the provincial law, as breach of the latter could result in suspension or cancellation of the liquor licence, but did not entail any penal consequences.

Further reading

References

Constitution of Canada
Canadian Confederation
Federalism in Canada